Antonín Dvořák's Piano Quintet No. 2 in A major, Op. 81, B. 155, is a quintet for piano, 2 violins, viola, and cello. It was composed between August 18 and October 8, 1887, and was premiered in Prague on January 6, 1888. The quintet is acknowledged as one of the masterpieces in the form, along with those of Schumann, Brahms and Shostakovich.

Background
The work was composed as the result of the composer's attempt to revise an earlier work, the first Piano Quintet in A major, Op. 5.  The new quintet is a mixture of Dvořák's personal form of expressive lyricism with elements from Czech folk music. Characteristically, those elements include styles and forms of song and dance, but not actual folk tunes; Dvořák created original melodies in the authentic folk style.

Structure
The music has four movements:

It has a duration of approximately 40 minutes.

The first movement opens quietly with lyrical cello theme over piano accompaniment which is followed by a series of elaborate transformations. The viola introduces the second subject which is another lyrical melody, but much busier than the cello's stately line. Both themes are developed extensively by the first and second violins and the movement closes with a free recapitulation and an exuberant coda.

The second movement is labeled Dumka, which is a form that Dvořák famously used in his Dumky piano trio. It features a melancholy theme on the piano separated by fast, happy interludes. It follows a seven-part rondo pattern, ABACABA, where A, in F minor, is the slow elegiac refrain on piano with variations, B is a bright D major section on violins, and C is a quick and vigorous section derived from the opening refrain. Each time the Dumka (A) section returns its texture is enriched.

The third movement is marked as a Furiant which is a fast Bohemian folk dance. The cello and viola alternate a rhythmic pizzicato underneath the main tune of the first violin. The slower trio section of the scherzo is also derived from the furiant theme, with the piano and violin alternating between the main melodies. The fast Bohemian folk dance returns and the movement finishes aggressively, setting up for the polka in the last movement.

The Finale is light-hearted and spirited. The second violin leads the theme into a fugue in the development section. In the coda, Dvořák writes tranquillo for a chorale-like section, which features the theme of the movement this time in augmentation and played pianissimo, before the pace quickens with an accelerando, and the quintet rushes to the finish.

Notes

References
Berger, Melvin (2001). Guide to Chamber Music, Mineola, NY: Dover Publications. .
MacDonald, Hugh. (1994): "Dvorák Piano Quintet Op. 81", (CD Liner notes from Dvořák Piano Quintet Op. 81 and Quartet Op. 87 by the Emerson String Quartet). Deutsche Grammophon, Hamburg.
Way, Joseph. "Sierra Chamber Society Program Notes", "Antonin Dvorak",May 20, 2001. Accessed February 11, 2008.

External links

Work details, antonin-dvorak.cz (in English)
Performance of Quintet by The Chamber Music Society of Lincoln Center from the Isabella Stewart Gardner Museum in MP3 format
, live performance with Anna Balakerskaia, piano, Ricardo Cyncynates, violin 1, Zino Bogachek, violin 2, Natasha Bogachek, viola, Misha Quint, cello.

Piano quintets by Antonín Dvořák
1887 compositions
Compositions in A major